Chapman Hobart Kitchen (February 8, 1903 — Unknown) was a Canadian ice hockey player who played 47 games in the National Hockey League with the Montreal Maroons and Detroit Cougars between 1925 and 1927. He also played parts of three seasons in the minor Canadian Professional Hockey League and Canadian–American Hockey League, retiring in 1929.

Career statistics

Regular season and playoffs

External links

1903 births
Year of death missing
Canadian ice hockey defencemen
Detroit Cougars players
Ice hockey people from Ontario
Kitchener Millionaires players
Montreal Maroons players
New Haven Eagles players
Ontario Hockey Association Senior A League (1890–1979) players
Sportspeople from Newmarket, Ontario